American Motors Corporation (AMC) and Jeep used a variety of transmissions and transfer cases.

This list covers AMC (1954+) and Jeep (1946+) variants thru 1988, and those legacy designs retained by Chrysler after 1988.

Early AMC (1955-1971) automatic

 AMC passenger cars

Early Jeep Automatic (1970-1971)

 Jeep CJ
 Jeep Wagoneer/Grand Wagoneer

Kaiser Jeep was purchased by AMC in 1970.

The Buick  V8, AMC 232 I6, and AMC 327, 360 V8 engines in the FSJ Wagoneer and trucks used a 'nailhead' pattern TH400—also known as a "unipattern," as it was used by many other manufacturers (including Rolls-Royce and Jaguar) with an adapter ring—from 1965-1972.

The Buick  V6, available with an optional automatic transmission in the Jeepster Commando, used the same 'nailhead' pattern TH400. Starting in 1973, AMC discontinued the use of the adapter ring, as it sourced a TH400 case from GM with the AMC bellhousing pattern already cast. The TH400 AMC case was used until the end of 1979 model production.

The  I6 used in 1970-72 Jeep DJ "Postal Jeep" was backed up by the Borg-Warner T-35 3-speed automatic. At the time of the acquisition, Kaiser-Jeep was using a GM 2-speed Powerglide transmission in the DJ-5A (with the GM-sourced 2.5L I4).

Late AMC/Jeep (1971-2006) automatic

 Jeep Cherokee XJ (1987–2001)
 Jeep Wrangler YJ and TJ (1987–2006)
 Jeep Grand Cherokee ZJ and WJ (1993–2004)
 Jeep Wagoneer/Grand Wagoneer

AMC phased out the use of the Borg-Warner Shift-Command transmissions when the company transitioned to using the Chrysler TorqueFlite. AMC branded the TorqueFlites as the Torque Command using the previous naming convention - both the A-727 and A-904 (including the later 999 derivatives) were used with the addition of the Aisin-Warner 4 (AW4) used with the Jeep XJ series. Jeep vehicles throughout the 1970s used the GM Turbo Hydramatic 400 - the use of the GM transmission goes back to 1965 where Kaiser-Jeep installed it in the AMC  V8 in the full-size Wagoneer and J-trucks.

The TH400 was phased out for the 1980 models, when the A-727 replaced the TH-400 as the only automatic transmission option for both the SJ Wagoneer/Cherokee wagons and the J-10/J-20 trucks. Internally similar to the Chrysler A-727, the case was one-piece, cast with an AMC pattern bellhousing (not interchangeable with a Chrysler pattern A-727).

AMC manual

See also
List of Chrysler transmissions (for list of transmission used in AMC vehicles after Chrysler buyout)

American Motors
AMC Transmission Applications